Radiofilum is a genus of green algae in the class Chlorophyceae.

References

Sphaeropleales genera
Sphaeropleales